Variations for Orchestra is the last ballet made by New York City Ballet co-founder and founding choreographer George Balanchine to Igor Stravinsky's Variations: Aldous Huxley in memoriam (1963–64). The premiere took place on Friday, 2 July 1982 at the New York State Theater, Lincoln Center.

Original cast 
Suzanne Farrell

Reviews 
NY Times review by Jack Anderson, 4 July 1982

Ballets by George Balanchine
Ballets to the music of Igor Stravinsky
1982 ballet premieres
New York City Ballet Stravinsky Centennial Celebration
New York City Ballet repertory